Maidenwell  may refer to:
Maidenwell, Lincolnshire, England
Maidenwell, Queensland, Australia